The 1938–39 Rugby Union County Championship was the 46th edition of England's premier rugby union club competition at the time.

Warwickshire won the competition for the first time after defeating Somerset in the final.

Semifinals

Final

See also
 English rugby union system
 Rugby union in England

References

Rugby Union County Championship
County Championship (rugby union) seasons